|}

The Ribblesdale Stakes is a Group 2 flat horse race in Great Britain open to three-year-old fillies. It is run at Ascot over a distance of 1 mile 3 furlongs and 211 yards (2,406 metres), and it is scheduled to take place each year in June.

History
The event is named in honour of the 4th Baron Ribblesdale, who served as the Master of the Buckhounds from 1892 to 1895. It was established in 1919, and it was originally a 1-mile race open to three and four-year-olds of either gender.

The race was abandoned throughout World War II, and after it returned its distance was extended to 1½ miles. It was restricted to three-year-old fillies in 1950.

The Ribblesdale Stakes sometimes features fillies which ran previously in the Epsom Oaks. The leading participants often go on to compete in the following month's Irish Oaks, and the last to win both was Bracelet in 2014.

The Ribblesdale Stakes is now held on the third day of the five-day Royal Ascot meeting.

Records
Leading jockey (8 wins):
 Frankie Dettori – Phantom Gold (1995), Bahr (1998), Fairy Queen (1999), Punctilious (2004), Flying Cloud (2009), Hibaayeb (2010), Star Catcher (2019), Frankly Darling (2020)

Leading trainer (5 wins): (includes jointly-trained winners)
 Henry Cecil – Catalpa (1976), Strigida (1981), Queen Midas (1987), Alydaress (1989), Yashmak (1997)
 John Dunlop – High Hawk (1983), Gull Nook (1986), Third Watch (1991), Thawakib (1993), Thakafaat (2005)
 Saeed bin Suroor – Bahr (1998), Fairy Queen (1999), Punctilious (2004), Flying Cloud (2009), Hibaayeb (2010)
 John Gosden - Michita (2008), Coronet (2017), Star Catcher (2019), Frankly Darling (2020), Loving Dream (2021)

Winners since 1965

 The 2005 running took place at York.

Earlier winners

 1919: Milton
 1920: Perion
 1921: The Yellow Dwarf
 1922: Dry Toast
 1923: Leighon Tor
 1924: Live Wire
 1925: Glommen
 1926: Artist Glow
 1927: Foliation
 1928: O'Curry
 1929: Sir Cosmo
 1930: Flying Argosy
 1931: Doctor Dolittle
 1932: Rose en Soleil
 1933: Versicle
 1934: The Blue Boy
 1935: Easton
 1936: Can-Can
 1937: Rhodes Scholar
 1938: River Prince
 1939: Ombro
 1940–47: no race
 1948: Sandastre
 1949: Colonist II
 1950: La Baille
 1951: Chinese Cracker
 1952: Esquilla
 1953: Skye
 1954: Sweet One
 1955: Ark Royal
 1956: Milady
 1957: Almeria
 1958: None Nicer
 1959: Cantelo
 1960: French Fern
 1961: Futurama
 1962: Tender Annie
 1963: Ostrya
 1964: Windmill Girl

See also
 Horse racing in Great Britain
 List of British flat horse races

References

 Paris-Turf:
 Racing Post:
 galopp-sieger.de – Ribblesdale Stakes.
 horseracingintfed.com – International Federation of Horseracing Authorities – Ribblesdale Stakes (2018).
 pedigreequery.com – Ribblesdale Stakes – Ascot.
 

Flat races in Great Britain
Ascot Racecourse
Flat horse races for three-year-old fillies
Recurring sporting events established in 1919
1919 establishments in England